Ui Shigure (しぐれうい Shigure Ui) is a Japanese illustrator, manga artist, light novel character designer and virtual YouTuber.

Career 
Ui was born in Yokkaichi, Mie Prefecture, Japan. She is an art graduate.

After working in a game development company, she began working as a freelance illustrator.

In August 2018, she started designing the appearance for Hololive Production's Virtual YouTuber Subaru Ōzora, who debuted in September the same year. Since then, she occasionally appears as a guest on Subaru's livestreams. In May 2019, she began livestreaming as a virtual YouTuber, where she livestreams herself chatting to the audience, illustrating and playing video games.

Personal life 
Ui has said that from a young age, her mother influenced her to start drawing. She also cites Arina Tanemura, Noizi Ito and Cocoa Fujiwara as major influences on her work.

Notable work

Book illustrations

Standalone
Fushishisha to Ansatsusha no Desu Gēmu (不死者と暗殺者のデスゲーム製作活動) (Written by Kaede Asamiya, published by Dengeki Bunko, ISBN                       9784048939188)
 Kanojo no L ~Usotsukitachi no Kōbōsen~ (彼女のL〜嘘つきたちの攻防戦〜) (Written by Chie Sanda, published by Famitsu Bunko, ISBN 9784047352308)
JK Anken Suishinchyū!! ~Torihikisaki no Youkyū de Ojōsama Joshikō no Ryō ni Sumikomu ni Natta~ (JK案件推進中!! 〜取引先の要求でお嬢様女子校の寮に住み込むことになった〜) (Written by Kazuki Fujimiya, published by Kadokawa Sneaker Bunko, ISBN 9784041074664)
 Kūru Bisho Kei Senpai ga Ie ni Tomatteike to Otomari o Yōkyūshitekimashita... (クール美女系先輩が家に泊まっていけとお泊まりを要求してきました......) (Written by Kano Shikihara, published by Earth Star Novels, ISBN 9784803012910)
 101 Mētoru Hanareta Koi (101メートル離れた恋) (Written by Rei Komatsu, published by Kodansha Light Novel Bunko, ISBN 9784065164747)
 Tensai Shōjo A to Kokuhakusuru Noberugēmu (天才少女Aと告白するノベルゲーム) (Written by Chie Sanda, published by Famitsu Bunko, ISBN 9784047358935)

Series
 Aoiro Noizu to <Yakimochi> Kirāchūn Wakeari JK to Hajimeru Dansō V Kei Bando (青色ノイズと〈やきもち〉キラーチューン ワケありJKと始める男装V系バンド) (Written by Mukai Sōya, published by MF Bunko J)
 Osamake (幼なじみが絶対に負けないラブコメ) (Written by Shūichi Nimaru, published by Dengeki Bunko)
 Kimi wa Boku no Kōkai (Written by Shimesaba, published by Dash X Bunko)

Anime
 BBK/BRNK The Gentle Giants of the Galaxy (Ep. 10, opening card illustrator)
 Rascal Does Not Dream of Bunny Girl Senpai (Anime adaptation announcement picture illustrator)
 PROJECT MAPLUS Pure Mon no Monster (Yoshiki Machida, character designer)
 WIXOSS DIVA (A) LIVE (Character designer)
 Osamake (2021 anime, original illustrator, voice-cameo)

Manga 
 Kankitsu Panchi! (かんきつパンチ!) (Published by Manga Time Kirara Miracle!, Houbunsha)

Art collections 
 Ame ni Kou (雨に恋う) (Published by Kenkōsha)

Character design 
 Ōzora Subaru (HoloLive Productions Virtual YouTuber, character designer)
 Shijimi Matsueshinjiko (Onsen Musume, character designer)

Other 
 WIXOSS Trading Card Game (Card illustrator)

Discography

Appearances 
 Numa ni Hamattekiitemita (April 5, 2021, NHK Educational TV)

References

External links 
しぐれどき - Tumblr
しぐれうい - Twitter
しぐれうい - Pixiv
しぐれうい - Pixiv FANBOX
しぐれうい - YouTube Channel
しぐれどき - Comiket Web Catalog

Japanese illustrators
Manga artists from Mie Prefecture
People from Mie Prefecture
VTubers
Living people
Year of birth missing (living people)
YouTube channels launched in 2019